Mir Akbar Khyber (January 11, 1925 – April 17, 1978) was an Afghan left-wing intellectual and a leader of the Parcham faction of People's Democratic Party of Afghanistan (PDPA). His assassination by an unidentified person or people led to the overthrow of Mohammed Daoud Khan's republic, and to the advent of a socialist regime in Afghanistan, the Democratic Republic of Afghanistan.

Early life and education
He was born on March 11, 1925, in Logar Province. Khyber graduated from Harbi Pohantoon Military University in 1947.

Career
In 1950 he was imprisoned for his revolutionary activities. Later he was employed by the Ministry of Education, until he was expelled from Paktia for taking part in a riot in 1965. After returning to Kabul, he became editor of the Parcham newspaper, Parcham, and oversaw the Parchams recruitment program in the Afghan Army. He was a close confidant of the Parcham leader Babrak Karmal.

Assassination
He was assassinated outside his home on 17 April 1978. The Daoud regime attempted to put the blame for Khyber's death on Gulbuddin Hekmatyar's Hezbi Islami, but Nur Mohammad Taraki of the PDPA charged that the government itself was responsible, a belief that was shared by much of the Kabul intelligentsia. Louis Dupree, an American historian and specialist of Afghanistan, concluded that interior minister Mohammed Issa Nuristani, a virulent anti-communist, had ordered the killing. However, several sources, including fellow Parchamites Babrak Karmal and Anahita Ratebzad, claimed that Hafizullah Amin, a leader of the rival Khalq faction, was the instigator of the assassination. But some former ministers of Khalq faction claim that the assassination was ordered by the Soviet Union and Karmal. Daoud's confidant, Abdul Samad Ghaus, suggested that a strong rivalry existed between Amin and Khyber as they both attempted to infiltrate the military for their respective factions. Also, Khyber's attempts to reunite Khalq and Parcham cells within the military would have undermined Amin's power, according to communist sources. Mr. Ghaus suggest that Amin's henchmen, Siddiq Alamyar and his brother, are responsible for assassination of both Khyber and Inamulhaq Gran (mistakenly thought to be Karmal) upon order from Amin. Alamyar became Amin's minister of planning and his brother president of the general transportation authority. 

At Khyber's funeral on April 19, some 15,000 PDPA sympathizers gathered in Kabul, and paraded through the streets chanting slogans against the CIA and the SAVAK, the Shah of Iran's secret police. Alarmed by this demonstration of communist strength, Daoud ordered a crackdown on the PDPA leadership, which in turn prompted the PDPA to launch a military coup that became known as the Saur Revolution, during which Daoud was killed, and the PDPA took power.

Notes

References

People's Democratic Party of Afghanistan politicians
Afghan communists
Assassinated Afghan politicians
1925 births
1978 deaths
Pashtun people